Nicholas Jeremy Rossiter (17 July 1961, Litton, Somerset – 23 July 2004, London) was an English television producer. He was arts producer for the BBC from 1987 to 2004.

Education
Rossiter was educated at Downside School, a Catholic boarding independent school in the village of Stratton-on-the-Fosse (near the market town of Shepton Mallet) in Somerset, in South West England, followed by Greyfriars at the University of Oxford, where he read Modern History.

Family
Rossiter married Bea Ballard in 1995; they had two daughters.

Death
Rossiter died of heart failure in London on 23 July 2004, aged 43.

References

External links

Film.cop website

1961 births
2004 deaths
English television producers
People educated at Downside School
People from Mendip District